The Port of Tianjin falls under the supervisory and regulatory purview of the Tianjin Municipality People’s Government. The 2004 incorporation of the Tianjin Port Authority into TPG formally divested the group of its role as Port Regulator, which passed to the Tianjin Transportation and Port Authority (天津市交通运输和港口管理局), formerly the Tianjin Transport Commission. The TTPA implements state policy on port work; drafts local policies, by-laws and regulations; and licenses, audits, and issues certifications to businesses operating in the port, in particular to ship terminals. The TTPA supervises and manages compliance to all laws and regulations regarding environmental protection, service compliance, pilotage, maintenance of port infrastructure and handling of dangerous goods and disinfection in all terminals and storage areas.

The Tianjin Municipality People’s Government Port Services Office (天津市人民政府口岸服务办公室): was set up in May 2009 to streamline port operations, in particular customs and inspection clearance procedures. The Port Services Office main duty is the coordination of port services, fostering collaboration between government offices and inspection units, and resolving conflicts and disputes among them (a duty which includes the power to issue emergency rulings to solve jurisdictional problems). The office is also the Port’s "foreign office", charged with fostering interchange and cooperation with other provinces (in particular the development of dry ports), and with foreign entities. Finally, the office is responsible for drafting the Port Development Plan and approving all development and expansion plans, developing streamlined procedures and comprehensive joint clearance, the development of the Tianjin e-Port, etc.

Tianjin Maritime Safety Bureau: Harbormaster powers for the Port of Tianjin are mostly vested on the Tianjin Maritime Safety Bureau (天津海事局), which is the local agency of the China Maritime Safety Administration. At present, the Tianjin Maritime Safety Administration has 17 functional departments and 24 subordinate units, for a total of more than 2,122 employees. It has seven local field offices in Xingang (covering the Beijiang port area), Nanjiang, Tanggu (covering the Haihe port area), Beigang (covering the Beigangchi basin, Beitang and Hanggu), Dongjiang and Lingang port areas, plus an under-construction base at the Nangang area.

Tianjin MSA carries out a wide array of duties regarding the safe management of port activities, including vessel traffic management and berth operations, navigational safety (including SAR, AtoN, navigational warnings and management of the GMDSS), local application of the China Ship Reporting System (CHISREP), ship and crewing inspection (including Flag State Control and Port State Control obligations), ship surveying, crewmen examination and credentialling, management of waterways and underwater works, shore installation safety, dangerous goods handling, law enforcement patrolling, marine accident investigation, and hydrographic survey and charting. Riverine traffic control and vessel inspection is the responsibility of the Tianjin Regional Maritime Safety Agency (天津市地方海事局), which is a separate unit under dual control by the Tianjin government and the China MSA.

Maritime Law: The Port of Tianjin falls under the jurisdiction of the Tianjin Maritime Court for all matters of national and international Maritime law, including all forms of maritime contracts, torts and offenses. The Court is based at TEDA, close to the Port, and it has also set up an “express window” at the Tianjin Port Service Center that provides legal consultation on matters of custom clearance; dispute resolution services; in situ summary issuance of emergency injunctions; protective writs; payment orders and the like; as well as a summary judgment service for simple and petty cases.

Inspection and clearance 

Inbound ships, cargo and personnel require clearance by four main government bodies: China Customs for customs declaration, Border Inspection for migration formalities, China Inspection and Quarantine for quarantine and fumigation, and the MSA for ship and crew safety regulations. Obtaining clearance from these so-called “One Customs Three Inspections” (一关三检) used to be quite a protracted process, and one of the continued foci of Port reform is to speed up the clearance procedures and reduce their (still significant) burden.

Customs Clearance: The custom agencies responsible for the Port are: the Tianjin Xingang Customs (天津新港海关), headquartered at the Container Logistics Center; the Tianjin Port Free Trade Zone Customs (天津港保税区海关), headquartered at the FTZ, and the Dongjiang Bonded Port Customs (东疆保税港区海关), headquartered at the Dongjiang Joint Inspection Center. All are subordinate units of Tianjin Customs (天津海关), which is responsible for the declaration, inspection, and duties collection for all international cargo, trade goods, luggage and postal items passing through the Port. This involves processing more than 1,52 million clearance forms a year, and efforts to streamline the process and to foster EDI use and other forms of electronic clearance are a continuous theme for Port reform.

Maritime Safety Controls: The Ship Supervision Office of the Tianjin MSA (天津海事局船舶监督处) carries out the obligations of Port State Control according to the Tokyo Memorandum of Understanding, and the obligations of Flag State Control according to the provisions of the Law of the Sea. It is tasked with monitoring the shipworthiness, safety and appropriate crewing of all vessels entering jurisdictional waters. In 2006, Tianjin was the first jurisdiction in China to introduce PSC checkpoints in accordance to the Tokyo protocol. In 2010, the MSA checked and examined 17,324 international vessels, and introduced an international maritime electronic checking and examining system to expedite the process.

Quarantine and Health Inspections: The Tianjin Entry-Exit Inspection and Quarantine Bureau (天津出入境检验检疫局) or TJCIQ, is tasked with the health inspection, quarantine, disinfection and sterilization of all trade goods, foodstuffs and live plants and animals, packaging materials and international ships, and the health inspection and quarantine services for all entering ship personnel and visitors, as well as the quality and safety inspection of chemical ore, metals and other cargoes with established standards. TJCIQ has stations at Xingang Liumi, the Shipping Service Center, Dongjiang, Nanjiang, Lingang, and Tanggu.

All ships must report to quarantine authorities at least three hours before anchoring, reporting the vessel's particulars, risk factors, and any suspected conditions among passengers or crew. Pratique and SSC exceptions are available, but the SARS and Swine Flu crises have increased the rigor of quarantine practices in China.

Migration and border control: Border control is the purview of the Tianjin Entry-Exit Frontier Inspection General Station (天津出入境边防检查总站), generally referred to as "Tianjin Immigration Inspection" or TJBJ by its Chinese initials. While it falls under the direct authority of the Ministry of Public Security, it is organizationally separate from the Tianjin Port PSB, employing 800 separate personnel. In the Port, the TJBJ has five local stations at Xingang Liumi, Donggang, Dongjiang, Nanjiang (which also covers the CNOOC oil platforms and the Lingang area) and Tanggu. Border Inspection deploys its own patrol boats (hulls marked Zhongguo Bianjian 12xxx), and can run immigration formalities while ships are at anchorage.

Port management 

Tianjin Port Group (TPG) is both the main Port Operator and Port Landowner, and retains some of the old Port Authority's supervisory functions. TPG is the holding company and Ultimate Controlling Party for most of the Tianjin Port operating units, and its affiliates and subordinate units run most aspects of port operation. The Dagukou port area is (at present) run separately by the Tianjin Lingang Port Group Co. (天津临港港务集团有限公司), owned by the Tianjin Lingang Economic Area Administrative Committee (of which TPG is a part).|

TPG also serves as Port Landlord, providing basic municipal services (including roads, power, water and sewerage) and other services, extending from construction materials to printing services, to the Port’s various tenant operators. In this role, TPG maintains quasi-municipal authority over port areas. Finally, as with all Chinese SOEs, the control and coordination role of the local Communist Party units is significant, as is the common cross-sharing of personnel among related units.

Traffic management and navigational safety

Area procedures and traffic rules 

The Vessel Traffic Service Center (天津船舶交通管理中心) of the MSA provides traffic control, navigation assistance and local communication to all vessels in the Port’s fairway, anchorages and berths. The VTS Center is located in an 88 m tall control tower at the eastern end of the Dongtudi (East Pier), and has two subordinate monitoring stations at Dongjiang and Lingang. Its control area extends 20 nautical miles (37 km) from the tower. Compliance with the VTSC’s authority is mandatory, and all ships must maintain watch on its VHF channel (Ch. 9) while on the port area. On the Haihe, both VHF 09 and 71 must be on watch.

Tianjin VTS monitors traffic with several overlapping systems: a Radar Surveillance System, a VHF Communications System, an AIS system, and a CCTV system. The traffic management system integrates these data sources to a theoretical tracking capacity of 100,000 ships at a time.

The Radar Surveillance System operates X-band marine radars from the Dongtudi tower and from the Nanjiang MSA base, and the associated ARPA system monitors ship tracks and provides collision early warning.

The AIS system is part of the very extensive AIS network covering all of China’s coasts. Dongtudi tower was set up March 2010 as both the local base station and as the regional AIS Service Center.

As of 2009, the VTS Center had five CCTV sites (at the VTS Control Tower, the Nanjiang Radar Station, the Bohai Oil Tower, the Coastal Radio Building, and the Port Authority Yuhaiyuan Dormitory (the last two on the Haihe shore), for a total of 10 traffic monitoring cameras; the Dagukou sub-center has its own CCTV system. The VTS Center also runs a hydro-meteorology data system (collecting real time data from over 25 stations and gauges), and is the main user of the weather warning system.

Traffic Rules: The Tianjin Port Main Channel is a conditional two-way channel. One-way restrictions are triggered by severe weather conditions (wind force 7 or higher), by wide ships (45 m beam for any one ship, or 75 m width total for both), by long tows (200 m or more), or by dangerous cargoes. Maximum speed in the main channel is set at 13 knots westward and 15 knots eastward, minimum speed at 5 knots. The Chuanzhadong Channel's maximum speed is 8 knots. Keel clearance must be 1.7 m or more at the Main Channel, 0.8 m at the Chuanzhadong Channel, and 0.5 m in the rest of the fairway. All ships must display flags or light signals according to the COLREGS and the International Code of Signals. The Dagusha Channel has separate regulations, speed limits are a maximum of 13 knots and a minimum of 5 knots.

Vessels are prohibited from entering or leaving the port, or shifting berths, without special authorization from the VTS Center if: 1) visibility is less than 1,000 m; 2) there are hazardous icing conditions; 3) wind force is 9 or over.
In the 2006–2010 period, there were a total or 1,382 hours of traffic closure or restriction.

Reporting Points: All vessels must report their ETA to the VTS Center at least 24 hours prior to entry into the VTS area (normally through their shipping agents), and apply for authorization. This initial report must contain the vessel’s ETA, name, nationality, call sign, draft, type, size, cargo situation and other information as needed. Position reports must be made at the following points:

 Before entering or leaving the Xingang Main Channel (at the VTS Gateline for other Channels)
 Before crossing through the fairway.
 Before doing a turnaround on the fairway.
 After getting berthed.
 Before leaving berth.
 Before clearing out the ship lock.
 Before getting anchored.
 After getting anchored.
 Before departing the anchorage.

Port traffic: Traffic volume is heavy, with 260 vessels entering or leaving port every day, and very large numbers of small vessels entering or leaving the fairways at any given time. In the 2006–2010 period the VTS communication service managed 362,000 instances, the navigation assistance service managed 323,000 instances, and the traffic control service 456,000 instances. In 2010, the port had a total of 97,276 ship movements, and around 70,000 ship movements involving ships over 60 m LOA. Despite all the capacity increases, there are still bottlenecks in the traffic. As of 18 March 2011, anchorage waiting time for a ship bound for the Nanjiang terminals was 2–4 days

Pilotage 

Use of harbor pilots is mandatory for all ships bearing a foreign flag, for ships carrying dangerous cargoes, during hazardous conditions and other circumstances requiring pilot assistance (normally, most ships over 60 m LOA with masters unfamiliar with the approaches). Pilots must be engaged at least 24 hours prior to arrival (normally by the shipping agent). The Pilot Center can also be contacted using VHF channel 8 or 16 during approach. The pilotage area includes all of the Haihe fairway, all of the Xingang fairway, all of the Dagusha fairway, the BZ28-1 and BZ34 oil fields in the Bohai Bay, and the SZ36 oilfield in Liaodong bay.

The Tianjin Port Pilot Center (天津港引航中心)is located in Tanggu, close to the Port Hospital. It is in charge of the training, certification and management of the harbor pilot corps, and of helping plan and coordinate pilotage operations. It is an autonomous agency directly under the Tianjin Transportation and Port Authority, having been separated from TPG in 2007. As with the rest of Tianjin Port, the Pilot Center has experienced very fast expansion in recent years. In 2002 it had 43 certified pilots, in 2007 it had 72 pilots (19 senior pilots), in 2008 it had 114 pilots,  in 2009 it had 121 pilots, and by April 2011 it employed 141 pilots, including 23 senior pilots, 19 first-class pilots, 29 second-class pilots, 37 third-class pilots and 16 trainee pilots, plus 17 administrative staffers.

The Center runs three Pilot Stations, for Beijiang, Nanjiang (covering Lingang) and Dongjiang (covering the Haihe). Pilots are dispatched using 5 specialized pilot ships (administered by the Tug & Lighter Company), in tugs, or, since 2004, through helicopter shuttle, into the anchorage embarkation points. These points are specified in the regulations as follows:

The Tianjin Port Pilots guided 11,590 ship movements in 2001, 13,500 in 2002, 20,892 in 2004, 23,702 in 2007, 23,489 in 2008, 20,975 in 2009 and 23,200 in 2010, and they are projected to reach 30,500 ship movements by 2015.

Aids to navigation 

The Tianjin Port's aids to navigation (AtoN) system is fairly dense, and growing rapidly. The MSA Beihai Navigational Security Center's Tianjin Aids to Navigation Office (北海航海保障中心天津航标处) is responsible for the maintenance of all navaids within the Tianjin area. In 2004, the AtoN office controlled 141 navaids in the Tianjin jurisdiction, including 3 lighthouses, 12 light beacons, 22 lead markers, 44 day beacons, 55 light buoys, 1 NDB station, 1 RBN/DGPS station, 3 radar transponders, 2 large AtoN ships, 2 small AtoN ships and 1 survey ship operating from two wharves. A big reform in 2008 greatly increased the AtoN density to accommodate the needs of the two-way 250,000 DWT channels, so by 2010, the number of navigational aids had gone up to 245: 3 lighthouses, 57 light beacons, 22 lead markers, 148 light buoys, 5 articulated beacons, 1 RBN/DGPS station, 2 AIS centers (Tianjin and Caofeidian), and 6 radar transponders. The AtoN maintenance fleet is now 7 strong. Expansion continues apace, and the recently (2011) commissioned Dagang channel was fully marked in July 2011 with 43 buoys.

The Port's channels are now fully laterally marked to IALA Region A (red to port) standards, including light, Racon and AIS marks. The Haihe is lined with 24 shore light beacons (plus 18 daymarks and three buoys) to provide guidance for the highly meandering river channel: the beacons on the left bank are tower beacons with black and white stripes, flashing a white light in Morse code A (• –) every 6 seconds; while the right bank uses red-and-white striped beacons with white lights flashing Morse code D (– • •) every 8 seconds.

Winter buoys are in place from December 1 to March 1 every year, and placing and replacing the buoyage has become a very extensive operation. The spring 2011 change from winter to warm weather buoys involved replacing 136 buoys.

Dagu Light: The landfall marker for Tianjin Port is the Dagu (Old style: Taku) Lighthouse (大沽灯塔), a wave-washed lighthouse built in 1978 on the same spot where a lightship was first moored in 1878. The light is a cylindrical concrete tower daymarked with narrow horizontal red stripes on white, and riprap protection at its base. The lighthouse is situated at the western end of the Dagukou anchorage, mooring is prohibited for one mile around it.

The Main Channel Lead Lights (天津港主航道导标) is a system of shore leading beacons that provide bearing guidance to ships entering the main basin. It consists of two sets, 1,700 m apart, of 7 lights each. The center-line lights mark the main lead line into the Channel, and the others mark the edges of the (old) two-way navigable channel. The Xingang Central Lead Light Front is located at the Beifang Ganghang terminal, on the north side of the Nanjiang Island. The Xingang Central Lead Light Rear is located within the Bohai Oil Company compound, on the south side of Nanjiang Island. The two lights align at a bearing of 281°36', which marks the main channel from the Dagu lighthouse up to the bend at the beginning of the Chuanzhadong channel.

The Chuanzha Centerline Lead Lights (新港船闸中线导标), located on the south shore of the Haihe, on the Lanjiadao peninsula. The two lights are aligned at a 294°22' bearing, which marks the route through the Chuanzhadong Channel and into the Xingang Shiplock from buoy 44 onwards. A set of six smaller beacons around the Shiplock marks the navigable channel boundaries.

Signal stations: A small number of traditional visual signal stations remain in operation.

 Beijiang Tide Station (北疆验潮站) is a pole tide gauge located at the end of the Dongtudi pier, to the north of the VTS tower, relaying real-time tide levels to incoming ships.
 Xingang Shiplock Traffic Signal Station (新港船闸通行信号台) is a 14 m tall white slat signal tower on top of the roof of the Shiplock’s offices. It marks the state of the shiplock and gives traffic clearance to crossing ships.
 North Taku Fort Depth Signal Station (北炮台水深信号台) is a white skeletal steel tower with slat signaling that gives information on tide heights and tidal streams to ships crossing the Xingang Shiplock. It is located at the very end of the Nanjiang island, built on top of the remains of one of the Taku Forts. The signal station was originally established in 1919 to give critical navigation information to ships crossing the shallow Taku Bar. The tide monitoring station inside the compound has historical significance for being the place where the Taku Zero datum was developed. Currently the site houses the Lingang AtoN Management Station (港海标管理站).

RBN-DGPS: The Beitang RBN-DGPS Station (北塘-DGPS台站) is located in the Shanggulin (上古林) sector of Dagang county (38°50′N 117°30′E), and provides RDF and Differential GPS service to all maritime users. The original RBN station was established in Beitang in 1958, and the DGPS station started service in December 2001. To allow for the redevelopment of Beitang town, the whole complex was relocated south to the site of the former Loran A station at Shanggulin in July 2010 (still retaining all its original signal identifiers and name).

Weather monitoring and reporting 

While the Port directly operates a number of hydro-meteorological stations (including tide gauges), weather forecasting is primarily the responsibility of the Tianjin Binhai New Area Weather Warning Center (天津市滨海新区气象预警中心), the local agency of the Tianjin Municipal Weather Bureau (天津市气象局). The Warning Center uses local (26 automatic weather stations in Binhai), national and satellite data to forecast marine and port weather. The Center's Weather Radar Station at TEDA (an S-band Doppler radar) gives early warning of squalls, waterspouts, and all sort of sudden severe weather within 230 km of shore. The Tanggu Oceanic Weather Station (天津市塘沽海洋气象台—WMOID: 54623), the first of China's 14 oceanic weather stations, forecasts the Bohai Sea area using data from the large weather observatory at Bohai Oil Platform A and from a number of marine telemetry stations.

The Tianjin Weather Bureau operates both as a public service and a commercial enterprise. In 2009 it started to set up a number of “communication systems” to speedily send weather information to critical users. Of these, the Tianjin Port Meteorological Information Comprehensive Service System (天津港气象信息综合服务系统) and the Bohai Sea Oceanic Forecasting Service System (环渤海海洋预报服务系统) cater specifically to the need of port and shipping operators. The Weather Bureau also runs additional privately contracted weather monitoring for the Port, in particular deploying 150 automatic wind observation points to provide real-time data to the Dispatching Center (as wind strongly affects shipping operations).

Maritime Communication and Navigation Distress and Safety 

Tianjin Coastal Radio: The Beihai Navigational Security Center's Tianjin Communications and Information Center (北海航海保障中心天津通信中心) runs the Tianjin Coastal Station (天津海岸电台, Callsign: XSV; Call: Tianjin Radio; MMSI 004121100). The Station is in charge of the communication obligations of the Global Maritime Distress Safety System in the Port’s jurisdiction, supports the SAR Center’s communication needs, and supports the MSA’s duties of coordination and communications.

Tianjin Coastal Radio also provides public maritime correspondence (CP) services in voice telephony, radiotelex and radiotelegraphy to ships within its range.

The Coastal Radio broadcasts from three antenna complexes: Tanggu Control Station (塘沽新港控台), located on the north shore of the lower Haihei, is the central control center and houses the VHF antenna. The Junliangcheng Antenna Tower (军粮城发信天线塔)in Dongli has the more powerful (10 kW) long-distance MF/HF transmitters. Finally, the Huanggang Receiving Station (黄港收信台), located to the south of the Second Huanggang Reservoir, is the main listening post

Distress and Safety Systems and Maritime Safety Information: There are three distress and safety communication systems in Tianjin jurisdictional waters, operated in parallel by the MSA, the Fisheries Bureau and the Coast Guard. While there is data sharing and coordination between the agencies, the systems are independent.

The MSA is responsible for the standard GMDSS implementation, and it (not the SARC) takes on the formal MRCC responsibilities for the Port. Tianjin Coastal Radio operates the DSC system, monitoring VHF Ch. 16 and MF 2182 kHz as per the requirements of SOLAS.

The NAVTEX system operates at present in Chinese in a non-IMO standard, and will soon (2012/13) operate in English at the 518 kHz international standard. Tianjin Coastal Radio also broadcasts MSI using wireless telegraphy, SSB, NDBP, and VHF networks.

The Fisheries Safety Communications Network (全国渔业安全通信网) is run by Fisheries Bureau, and it is quite separate from standard civil marine communications. The FSCN operates as a VMS, using the standard VHF and AIS-B networks, but it also uses its own independent network of HF coastal stations (全国渔业安全通信网), a separate system of FM voice radio operating at the 27.5 MHz-39.475 MHz band (using specialized radio equipment), and a CDMA network run on China Telecom’s cellphone network (“渔信e通” or “Fishing Communications e-Connect”). The fisheries control system has its own protocols for automatic position reporting, MSI, meteorological reports, distress monitoring and SAR operations.

The Border Protection Communication Station (边防通信台站) is part of the "Marine 110" Command Center (“海上110”指挥中心), which is the fast response command and control system of the Coast Guard, receiving all forms of alert, and directing SAR missions, interdiction, and general law enforcement operations. The Tianjin Center was completed in 2005 and expanded in 2007 and 2011. It uses the Tianjin Municipal Coastal Monitoring System (地级海防监控系统), which covers 100 km of coastline with 160 CCTV cameras (with night vision capabilities), and deep-surveillance radar. to monitor the coast to around 70 km from shore.

SAR operations and emergency response 
Maritime Rescue Coordination: The primary SAR coordination agency is the Tianjin Maritime Search and Rescue Center (天津市海上搜救中心), with responsibility for coordinating all SAR activities in Port waters. Peculiarly, it is not a formal part of the MSA structure (it falls under the direct jurisdiction of the China Maritime Search and Rescue Center), but the TJMSA has administrative authority, and both units share leadership personnel. The SAR Center staffs a main base, five sub-bases (in Haihe, Lingang, Nangang, Dongjiang and Hangu), and four coordination and liaison branch offices at the CNOOC Bohai Oil Company, at the Fisheries Bureau (天津水产局), at the Civil Aviation Administration of China's Tianjin Air Traffic Control (中国民航天津空管站), and at the MSA Dangerous Substances and Pollution Control office (天津海事局危管防污处). The SAR Center's Emergency Command Center is located in Tanggu, and it shares the MSA's VTS, radar, communication, AIS and CCTV systems. It can be contacted via VHF channel 24, or using the specialized maritime emergency phone number "12395"(a number effective in most of China). In the 2006-2010 period, the SARC coordinated 136 rescue operations assisting 132 vessels in distress and rescuing 1430 seafarers, a success rate of 96.5%.

The Tianjin Search and Rescue Base is one of the six rescue bases of the China Rescue and Salvage Beihai Bureau, which is the front-line rescue and salvage force of the Ministry of Transport. The base was built in 1995, covering 0.65 hectares on Nanjiang Island, next to the CNOOC Bohai Oil Compound, at the western end of the Tianjin Harbor Basin. The Base had a staff of 67 in 2009, including diving specialists. In December 2010, Tianjin Port started China's first "Volunteer Maritime Search and Rescue Team" (海上搜救志愿者队伍), to serve as an ancillary force for the Rescue Base. At present it is composed mostly of specialists recruited from within port employees.

SAR Assets: Tianjin Rescue Base keeps three dynamic standby stations, normally with the following units:

 Search and Rescue Base’s Wharf: One Fast Rescue Boat (Huaying 387) and one rescue tug.
 Dagukou Anchorage: One 1940 kW Rescue Ship (Beihaijiu 169)
 Beihai 2nd Point (10 NM south of Caofeidian, 38º50´N / 118º25´E) : One 1940 kW Rescue Ship (Beihaijiu 115)

All government patrol ships, and all TPG harbor craft are available for search and rescue under MSA authority. Ships belonging to CNOOC Bohai are also routinely asked to assist in all cases of accident or mishap, as well as to participate in regular disaster preparation exercises. Finally, eight harbor crafts and two fishing boats have been “deputized” as a volunteer SAR boat team (志愿船舶队伍).
Air assets are relatively scarce. Closest China SAR seaplanes or helicopters are located at Penglai, Qingdao and Dalian, but as of 2011 bases are being set up in Qinhuangdao and Tianjin. As a substitute, Tianjin SARC has in the past used commercial helicopters from CITIC Offshore Helicopter Service (the helicopter service provider for CNOOC Bohai) for SAR missions.

Tianjin Port PSB Fire Services Detachment (天津港公安局消防支队) holds the fire-fighting and fire prevention duties for both the land and water areas of the Port. As of 2009, the detachment had 13 firetrucks, and the Tanggu District’s Fire Services Detachment cooperates with any incidents on land (the standard emergency number 119 can be used to report incidents in the Port area, land or sea). Tianjin Port also has a volunteer fire department, a relatively uncommon outfit in China, set up to assist on fire monitoring, disaster firefighting, and rescue.

On behalf of the Firefighting Detachment, the Tianjin Port Tug & Lighter Company operates three dual-purpose tugs/fireships (Jingang Xiaotuo 1, Jinganglun 25 and Jinganglun 30), plus five other tugs that have significant fire-fighting capacity. Three more vessels are under construction. All harbor vessels with suitable pumps can be pressed into service in case of maritime conflagration.

Emergency Medical Assistance: The Tianjin Port Hospital (天津港口医院) is the primary provider of emergency medical care in the port. It is a 314-bed comprehensive hospital, owned by TPG, that is specially licensed to deal with infectious disease outbreaks, quarantine and maritime accident trauma: its orthopedic trauma department is especially well ranked nationally. The hospital also has special provisions to cater to foreign visitors and crew members. Maritime Telemedical Assistance Service can be requested by messaging "HD MEDICO XSV" on Ch 16 radiotelephony (preceded with PAN PAN for urgent cases), or radiotelexing “MED+" (prefixing “XXX” for urgent cases) to 2012 XSV CN on 2082 kHz.

Pollution Control: Tianjin MSA is the Port’s “National Operational Contact Point” pursuant to MARPOL, and must be contacted (VHF 9) in all incidents of shipborne harmful substance spills. The MSA is, as of 2011, setting up an oil spill control center (天津市海上溢油及化学品事故应急反应中心) in Dongjiang, and it is stockpiling materials with a target of being able to rapidly control spills of up to 2,000 tons (a mid-size spill).

The State Oceanic Administration has overlapping authority regarding spills and pollution, usually concentrated on oil platform and pipeline incidents. SOA's Tianjin Station of the Oceanic Environmental Monitoring Center (天津海洋环境监测中心站), formerly the Tanggu Marine Station, is located at the Dongtudi pier and carries out the environmental monitoring, surveying and forecasting duties, including red tide prediction and pollution surveillance. As of 2010, the Monitoring Center deployed 121 environmental monitoring stations in and around Port waters.

Law enforcement 

The maritime governance regime in China is peculiar in its multiplicity of actors and apparent duplication of labor. Five major agencies (MSA, SOA, CCG, FLEC, GAC), plus the local People’s Police and other local units, divide maritime and coastal law enforcement, safety and administrative duties, with much overlap in formal remits. These agencies’ responsibilities reflect the functional jurisdiction of their parent ministries, and their operational emphases fit those jurisdictions. Only the Coast Guard (Maritime Police) patrol vessels are armed gunboats, and the Guard has first line jurisdiction in gendarmerie missions such as terrorism, piracy and serious crimes.

People’s Police Units 

The Tianjin Port Public Security Bureau (天津港公安局) is one of the fourteen branch offices of the Tianjin Public Security Bureau, with sub-bureau status. It is responsible for public order, law enforcement, criminal investigation, road traffic control, and fire safety and firefighting. Its territorial jurisdiction covers the nearly 260 square kilometers of land and waters of the Tianjin Port, the ships entering the port, the premises of all of the sub-units of the TPG, and other adjacent areas. It has three branch offices at Xingang (Beijiang), Nanjiang and Dongjiang, and 10 local police stations. As of 2010 it had 590 policemen (with an expansion to 1,000 officers planned), 153 civilian employees, 240 firefighters, plus oversight control of more than 1,500 security guards.

Water Police: The Tianjin Port PSB has its own water police unit running its own patrol boats, which are berthed on a floating pontoon station (天津港公安局水上治安派出所) built on a converted floating crane, currently located on the K1 berth of the Tianjin Port Passenger Terminal.

Border Protection: the Public Security Border Troops (公安边防部队) are a gendarmerie force under control of the MPS in charge of border protection and security. The border guards' local ground unit is the Binhai New Area Public Security Border Protection Detachment (滨海新区公安边防支队). The Binhai Border Troops staff three stations located within the Port area (Donggu, Gaoshaling, Beitang), with five more under construction (Dongjiang, Lingang, Nangang, Binhai Tourist Area and the Central Fishing Port).

The Border Guards' maritime branch (usually called the China Coast Guard, or more strictly the China Maritime Police) is responsible for marine border protection and policing. The local unit is the Tianjin Border Protection Maritime Police Flotilla (天津公安边防总队海警支队), which has jurisdiction over a 24,000 km2 area. Its patrol boats (hull numbers zhongguo haijing 12xxx) operate from the Border Troops Wharf at Yujiapu in the Haihe; occasionally from the SAR wharf in Nanjiang; and from a new pontoon wharf in Nangang. Current plans are to build one major maritime police base and six small wharves.

The Tianjin Customs Anti-Smuggling Bureau (天津海关缉私局), usually called the Anti-Smuggling Police (天津海关缉私警察) is a People's Police unit under the dual command of the MPS and the GAC. It is the main body engaged in control, prevention and investigation of customs fraud and duty evasion and smuggling (including cultural goods, drugs, dangerous materials, etc.). The Tianjin ASB does not deploy revenue cutters, but boats from Yantai or Qingdao have been occasionally seconded to Tianjin.

Other law enforcement bodies 

The law enforcement arms of the MSA are the Tianjin Maritime Public Security Bureau (天津海事公安局) and the Tianjin MSA Law Enforcement Patrol Flotilla (天津海事局巡查执法支队). The Tianjin Maritime PSB (not to be confused with the Tianjin Port Public Security Bureau) is responsible for maritime law enforcement and carries out marine accident and criminal investigations. The Patrol Flotilla deploys eleven patrol ships (hull numbers haixun 05xx), which monitor and manage shipping traffic, maintain navigational order and safety, and cooperate on patrol, escort, and search and rescue missions as needed.

The Second Detachment of China Maritime Surveillance (中国海监第二支队) of the Tianjin Oceanic Administration has jurisdiction over the Bohai and Laizhou Bays, and over all the coastal areas of Tianjin and Hebei. It monitors environmental damage, illegal use of sea resources, violation of maritime regulations, and damage to marine facilities. It also surveys sea ice, red tides, and other hazardous oceanic conditions. It deploys its own patrol boats (hull numbers Zhongguo Haijian xx), and new bases are under construction at the Dagukou area and the Beitang area.

The Tianjin Fisheries Management and Fishing Port Supervision and Management Office (天津市渔政渔港监督管理处) is a branch of the Tianjin Fisheries Bureau under the China Fisheries Law Enforcement Command Center (中国渔政指挥中心). It is in charge of enforcing fishing regulations, of controlling illegal, unreported and unregulated fishing (IUU), and of fishing navigational safety. It enforces the annual fishing moratorium, protected fish reserves, and other fishing restrictions. The Fisheries Law Enforcement Tianjin Flotilla (中国渔政天津市船队) is the patrol boat unit (hull numbers Zhongguo Yuzheng 12xxx). Tianjin FLEC does not at present have a dedicated base, so its ships are berthed at the Donggu Fishing Port, Haihe Border Guard Wharf and the MSA wharves.

Notes

Port of Tianjin